Avril Palmer-Baunack (born April 1964) is the chief executive of British Car Auctions, which auctions around 750,000 used cars in the United Kingdom every year. She is the former chairman of Stobart Group.

References

British chief executives
Living people
1964 births
British women chief executives